Yang Yurou (born 16 July 1996) is a Chinese handball player for Anhui Handball and the Chinese national team.

She competed at the 2015 World Women's Handball Championship in Denmark.

Achievements
Norwegian League:
Winner: 2019/2020
Norwegian Cup:
Winner: 2019

References

External links

1996 births
Living people
Chinese female handball players
Handball players at the 2018 Asian Games
Asian Games silver medalists for China
Asian Games medalists in handball
Medalists at the 2018 Asian Games
Sportspeople from Anhui
Expatriate handball players
Chinese expatriate sportspeople in Norway